Over the Hill is an Australian television drama which first screened on the Seven Network in 1994. Over the Hill was produced by Gary Reilly, written by John Flanagan and directed by Tony Osicka and Leigh Spence. It was not renewed after its first season of 13 episodes.

Synopsis
Over the Hill follows the story of a couple who realise the great Australian dream of buying a pub in the country.

Cast
 Georgie Parker as Sandy Spencer
 Nicholas Eadie as Don Spencer
 Belinda Cotterill as Melissa Spencer
 Nic Testoni as Jeremy 
 Darren Yap as Kevin
 Roy Billing as Short Bob
 Bruce Spence as Tall Bob
 Peter Gwynne as Pat the Poet

See also 
 List of Australian television series
 List of Seven Network programs

References

External links
 
 Over the Hill at the Australian Television Information Archive

Australian drama television series
Television shows set in New South Wales
English-language television shows
Seven Network original programming
1994 Australian television series debuts
1995 Australian television series endings